Buon Natale is the cultural festival organized by the Thrissur Archdiocese and Thrissur Citizenry in association with Christmas celebration. It is held at the premises of Thrissur city in Kerala every year from 2013. Buon Natale procession entered the Guinness World Records in 2014 for having the maximum number of people dressed up as Santa Claus. This event was started to raise charitable funds along with the celebrations.

History 
The Buon Natale was first conducted by the Thrissur Archdiocese in 2013. This was flagged of by former president of India, A.P.J. Abdul Kalam. 5,000 Santa Clauses and 2,000 angels was part of this cultural event. On 27 December 2014 this event had the participation of 18,112 number Santa Clauses and won the Guinness World Records. Due to COVID-19 pandemic there were no celebrations in the year 2020 and 2021.

2022 
The 10th edition of Buon Natale was held on December 27, 2022. The procession started from St. Thomas College, Thrissur and goes round through the Swaraj Round, Thrissur. The Union Minister of State for Minority Affairs, John Barla was the chief guest of the 2022nd Buon Natale.

Procession 
The procession starts from St Thomas College in Thrissur, encircles Swaraj Round and ends at Saktan Thampuran Ground. Members from different churches under the Thrissur Archdiocese participates in the procession.

References

External links

Culture & Heritage Thrissur District
Archdiocese of thrissur

Festivals in Thrissur district
December observances